At least three ships of the French Navy have borne the name Vautour:

 , a lugger which fought in the Algeciras campaign
 , a  launched in 1889 and stricken in 1908
 , an  launched in 1930 and sunk in 1944

French Navy ship names